Magomed Tazhudinovich Gadzhiyev (born 7 April 1965) is a Russian political and public figure. He served as a deputy of the State Duma for its 4th, 5th, 6th and 7th convocations. He is a member of the United Russia political party, and served as a member of the Duma's Committee on Development of Civil Society, Public and Religious Organizations. He is a Major General of the Federal Taxation Service.

Biography 
Gadzhiyev was born on 7 April 1965 in Makhachkala, then in the  Dagestan Autonomous Soviet Socialist Republic, in the Soviet Union. In 1996 Gadzhiyev graduated from the Institute of Management and Business in Makhachkala and then in 1998 completed a degree at the Faculty of Law of the Dagestan State University.

After his discharge from military service, he was appointed deputy director (1985-1994), then director (1994-1996) of the Khushetskaya equipment base of the Dagvino association of the Dagestan ASSR. In 1996, after graduation, he joined the West Caspian basin administration for protection, repopulation of the stock of fish and fisheries regulation as deputy director of the administration. From 1998 to 2001, he held the positions of the deputy head of the tax service of the Republic of Dagestan and deputy head of the Department of the Ministry of Taxation for the Republic of Dagestan.

Since 2001 he worked as Deputy Head of the Interregional Inspection of the Ministry of Taxes and Duties of the Russian Federation for the Southern Federal District. In December 2003, he was elected as deputy of the 4th convocation of the State Duma.

In 2007, he was elected to the State Duma's 5th convocation as part of the federal list of candidates nominated by the political party United Russia.

In December 2011, he was nominated from the United Russia political party to the State Duma of the Russian Federation, according to the results of the distribution of mandates, he was elected to the State Duma's VI convocation.

In September 2016, he was nominated to the State Duma of the Russian Federation from the United Russia political party, according to the results of the distribution of mandates, he was elected a deputy of the State Duma's VII convocation.

In June 2022, during the Russian invasion of Ukraine, Gadzhiyev sent humanitarian aid to the residents of the Donetsk and Lugansk regions. A convoy with the logos #Zанаших #сVоихнебросаем delivered food and essential goods. He also organized the dispatch of military equipment for Russian volunteers who are fighting in Ukraine.

Legislative activity 

From 2004 to 2019, during his term as a deputy of the State Duma of the 4th, 5th, 6th and 7th convocations, he co-authored 303 legislative initiatives and amendments to draft federal laws.

References 

1965 births
Living people
21st-century Russian politicians
United Russia politicians
People from Makhachkala
Fourth convocation members of the State Duma (Russian Federation)
Fifth convocation members of the State Duma (Russian Federation)
Sixth convocation members of the State Duma (Russian Federation)
Seventh convocation members of the State Duma (Russian Federation)